The 67th Bodil Awards were held on 1 February 2014 in the Bremen Theater in Copenhagen, Denmark, honouring the best national and foreign films of 2013. The Hunt won the award for Best Danish Film.

Jesper Langberg received a Bodil Honorary Award for his outstanding career in Danish films.

Winners

Best Danish Film 
 The Hunt
 Keeper of Lost Causes
 Nordvest
 Nymphomaniac
 Sorrow and Joy

Best Documentary 
 Ai Weiwei: The Fake Case
 Blodets bånd
 Sepideh

Best Actor in a Leading Role 
 Mads Mikkelsen – The Hunt
 Gustav Dyekær Giese – Nordvest
 Jacob Cedergren – Sorrow and joy
 Nicolas Bro – Spies & Glistrup
 Stellan Skarsgård – Nymphomaniac

Best Actress in a Leading Role 
 Charlotte Gainsbourg – Nymphomaniac
 Helle Fagralid – Sorrow and joy
 Sofie Gråbøl – The Hour of the Lynx
 Stacy Martin – Nymphomaniac

Best Actor in a Supporting Role 
 Roland Møller – Nordvest
 Fares Fares – Keeper of Lost Causes
 Jamie Bell  – Nymphomaniac
 Lars Ranthe – The Hunt
 Thomas Bo Larsen – The Hunt

Best Actress in a Supporting Role 
 Susse Wold – The Hunt
 Anne Louise Hassing – The Hunt
 Kristin Scott Thomas – Only God Forgives
 Sonja Richter – Keeper of Lost Causes
 Uma Thurman – Nymphomaniac

Best Cinematography 
 Charlotte Bruus Christensen – The Hunt

Best American Film 
 Beasts of the Southern Wild
 Before Midnight
 Django Unchained
 Frances Ha
 Gravity

Best Non-American Film 
 La Vie d'Adèle – Chapitres 1 & 2
 De rouille et d'os
 Paradise trilogy
 The Broken Circle Breakdown
 The Great Beauty

Bodil Special Award 
 CPH:DOX

Bodil Honorary Award 
 Jesper Langberg

Henning Bahs Award 
 Rasmus Thjellesen (scenography) – Keeper of Lost Causes

See also 

 2014 Robert Awards

References 

2013 film awards
Bodil Awards ceremonies
2014 in Copenhagen
February 2014 events in Europe